L1Base is a database of functional annotations and predictions of active LINE1 elements.

See also
 Interspersed repeat

References

External links
 http://l1base.charite.de/l1base.php

Biological databases
Repetitive DNA sequences
Mobile genetic elements